is a Japanese retired footballer of Taiwanese descent.

Club career

Jubilo Iwata
After ten seasons playing for Jubilo Iwata, Fujita retired in December 2020.

Club statistics
Updated to 19 February 2019.

References

External links
Profile at Júbilo Iwata 
Profile at Oita Trinita 

Fujita's story revealing. In 中文-English version 

1983 births
Living people
Juntendo University alumni
Association football people from Tochigi Prefecture
Japanese footballers
J1 League players
J2 League players
JEF United Chiba players
Oita Trinita players
Júbilo Iwata players
Association football defenders